Cyprinus intha is a species of ray-finned fish in the genus Cyprinus. The species is endemic to Inle Lake, a large, isolated freshwater lake on the Shan Plateau in eastern Myanmar. It is considered to be endangered, among other reasons, because of widespread hybridization with introduced Common Carp, Cyprinus carpio.

References 

 

Cyprinus
Fish described in 1918